Lewis Hopkin (c.1708–1771) was a Welsh craftsman and poet.

Life
He was the son of Lewis Hopkin (died 1756) of Peterston-super-montem, Glamorgan, and his wife Joan Thomas. A carpenter who picked up other crafts, he moved as a young man to Hendre Ifan Goch in the parish of Llandyfodwg, Glamorgan, where he settled. He was active in trade and surveying, and the cultural life of Upper Glamorgan.

Death
Hopkin died 17 November 1771, and was buried in Llandyfodwg churchyard. Two of his bardic pupils, Edward Evans 
and Edward Williams—Iolo Morganwg—wrote poems on his death.

Works
In 1767 Hopkin, with Edward Evans, published a rhymed version of the Book of Ecclesiastes since published in editions of Evans's Works. Hopkin's translation of Chevy Chase and other poems were published in different numbers of the Eurgrawn of 1770. His poetical works were collected and published at Merthyr Tydvil in 1813, under the title Y Fel Gafod: sef Cywyddau, Englynion, a Chaniadau ar amryw achosion, gan y diweddar Lewis Hopkin, pris dau swllt. The editor was John Miles of Pencoed, Llanilid, Glamorganshire, son-in-law to Hopkin.

Family
Hopkin married Margaret Bevan, from a Quaker background, and they had 11 children, of whom four became adults. His published works contain an English poem by a son, the Rev. Lewis Hopkin. Another son, Hopkin Hopkin (1737–1754), became famous as a dwarf.

Notes

External links
Attribution

1771 deaths
Welsh poets
Year of birth uncertain